This article presents a list of the historical events and publications of Australian literature during 1874.

Books 

 Rolf Boldrewood — My Run Home
 Mary Anne Broome
 Boys
 Sybil's Book
 Marcus Clarke — Chidiock Tichbourne, or The Catholic Conspiracy
 Maud Jean Franc — John's Wife
 Henry Kingsley — Reginald Hetherege

Short stories 

 Marcus Clarke — "Gipsies of the Sea, or The Island of Gold"
 J. Brunton Stephens — "Bailed Up with a Whitewash Brush"

Poetry 

 Catherine Martin— The Explorers and Other Poems
 Henry Kendall
 "Rover"
 "Song of the Shingle Splitters"
 "The Voice in the Native Oak"

Births 

A list, ordered by date of birth (and, if the date is either unspecified or repeated, ordered alphabetically by surname) of births in 1874 of Australian literary figures, authors of written works or literature-related individuals follows, including year of death.

 19 May — Will M. Fleming, politician, novelist and poet (died 1961)
 31 August — Ambrose Pratt, novelist (died 1944)
 17 September — Walter Murdoch, academic and essayist (died 1970)
 17 October — Lionel Lindsay, artist and essayist (died 1961)
 23 December — Marie Bjelke Petersen, novelist (died 1969)
 26 December — J. H. M. Abbott, poet and novelist (died 1953)

Deaths 

A list, ordered by date of death (and, if the date is either unspecified or repeated, ordered alphabetically by surname) of deaths in 1874 of Australian literary figures, authors of written works or literature-related individuals follows, including year of birth.

See also 
 1874 in poetry
 List of years in literature
 List of years in Australian literature
1874 in literature
1873 in Australian literature
1874 in Australia
1875 in Australian literature

References

 
Australia
19th-century Australian literature
Australian literature by year